Oca is the name given to the typical Brazilian indigenous housing. The term comes from the Tupi-Guarani language family.

They are large buildings, serving as collective housing for several families,
and may reach 40 m in length. They are built through joint effort over one week, with a wooden structure and bamboo and straw cover or palm leaves. They can last up to 15 years. They have no internal divisions or windows, only a few doors.

See also
 Maloca
 Vernacular architecture

References and notes 
General
 COP8/MOP3, 16 March 2003. Amanhã, cerimônia ao pôr do sol inaugura ocas Xavante, by  Marina Koçouski.
 Arte Indígena
Citations

Huts
Indigenous culture in Brazil
Vernacular architecture